Parabarrandia is a genus of trilobite of the Asaphida order. These fast-moving nektonic carnivores lived in the Ordovician period.

Species
Parabarrandia bohemica (Novák, 1884)

References

External links
 Biolib

Nileidae
Asaphida genera
Ordovician trilobites of Europe